Dunay-e Olya (also Romanized as Dūnāy-e ‘Olyā; also known as Dūnā, Dūnā-ye ‘Olyā, and Dūnā-ye Bālā) is a village in Owzrud Rural District, Baladeh District, Nur County, Mazandaran Province, Iran. At the 2006 census, its population was 290, in 68 families.

References 

Populated places in Nur County